Matapédia is a former provincial electoral district in the Bas-Saint-Laurent region of Quebec, Canada, which elected members to the National Assembly of Quebec.  It is at the western edge of the Gaspé Peninsula.

It was created for the 1923 election from a portion of the electoral district of Matane.  Its final election was in 2008.  It disappeared in the 2012 election by merging all of its territory with part of Matane, and the successor electoral district was Matane-Matapédia.

Linguistic demographics
Francophone: 99.4%
Anglophone: 0.5%
Allophone: 0.1%

Members of the Legislative Assembly / National Assembly
 Joseph Dufour, Liberal (1923–1936)
 Fernand Paradis, Union Nationale (1936–1939)
 Joseph Dufour, Liberal (1939–1944)
 Philippe Cossette, Union Nationale (1944–1952)
 Clovis Gagnon, Union Nationale (1953–1960)
 Bona Arsenault, Liberal (1960–1976)
 Léopold Marquis, Parti Québécois (1976–1985)
 Henri Paradis, Liberal (1985–1994)
 Danielle Doyer, Parti Québécois (1994–2012)

Election results

|-

|Danielle Doyer
|align="right"|8,815
|align="right"|51.34
|align="center"|+7.56
|-
 
|Liberal
|Jean-Yves Roy
|align="right"|5,828
|align="right"|33.44
|align="center"|+8.57

|-

|-
|}

|-

|Danielle Doyer
|align="right"|9,042
|align="right"|43.78
|align="center"|-1.7

|-
 
|Liberal
|Normand Boulianne
|align="right"|5,137
|align="right"|24.87
|align="center"|-6.48
|-

|-

|-
|}

|-

|-
  
|Liberal
|Gaston Pelletier
|align="right"|6,339
|align="right"|31.35
|align="right"|

|-
|}

References

External links
Information
 Elections Quebec

Election results
 Election results (National Assembly)
 Election results (Elections Quebec)

Maps
 2001 map (Flash)
2001–2011 changes (Flash)
1992–2001 changes (Flash)
 Electoral map of Bas-Saint-Laurent region (as of 2001)
 Quebec electoral map, 2001

Former provincial electoral districts of Quebec